The Midnight Special Bookstore was an independent bookstore in southern California. It catered to a leftist clientele. Its merchandise and events emphasized current events such as the civil rights movement, the Vietnam War, the Israeli-Palestinian conflict, the Chinese democracy movement and U.S. intervention in Afghanistan and Iraq.

History
Founded in 1970 as a co-op in Venice, the shop "was run predominantly by volunteers" until around 1985.

In 1980 it moved from Venice to 
1350 Third Street
 (also known as 1350 Santa Monica Mall) in Santa Monica, then in 1992 moved again to 1318 Third Street Promenade. For more than ten years, the mall's landlord charged the shop less rent than other tenants were paying, but with a change in management and success in attracting upscale tenants, the mall operator asked for an increase that would "more than double" the rent. For this reason, the bookstore moved out of its Third Street location in March 2003. Its stock was kept in storage for eight months. In November 2003, the store reopened at 1450 Second Street in Santa Monica, then finally closed around June 2, 2004. Its owner cited weak sales and continuing financial difficulties as the reason for closing:

Authors who appeared at the shop:
 Cecilia Brainard
 Octavia Butler
 bell hooks
 Paulo Coelho
 Slavoj Žižek
 Eduardo Galeano
 Viggo Mortensen
 Dave Eggers
 Elaine Brown
 Lalo Alcaraz
 Walter Mosley
 Trinh Minh-ha
 Edward Said
 Junko Mizuno
 Margaret Randall
 Maya Angelou
 Tariq Ali
 Michael Ventura
 Paul Krassner
 Tavis Smiley
 consumer advocate David Horowitz
Bernadette Devlin

Among other people who made appearances at the shop were filmmakers
Robert Greenwald and Oliver Stone, actor David Warshofsky, Elaine Brown of the Black Panther Party, UCLA professor Khaled Abou El Fadl; and musicians Dave Marsh, Jello Biafra, Frank Zappa and Ray Manzarek.

References 

Bookstores in California
Independent bookstores of the United States
Companies based in Los Angeles
Venice, Los Angeles
Companies based in Santa Monica, California
Bookstores established in the 20th century
American companies established in 1970
Retail companies established in 1970
Retail companies disestablished in 2004
1970 establishments in California
2004 disestablishments in California
Defunct companies based in Greater Los Angeles
Defunct retail companies of the United States